Badrul Feisal bin Abdul Rahim (6 July 1969 – 31 May 2020) was a Malaysian business executive. He was Chairman and Chief Executive Officer of UMW Holdings from 2015 to 2020.

Education
Badrul Feisal held a Bachelor of Science in Accounting at the University of Missouri in Columbia, United States and an American Associate Degree (AAD) in Accounting at MARA College of Science.

Career
Badrul Feisal joined UMW as Senior General Manager at the President's Office and Group Chief Executive Officer in December 2010 and was appointed Executive Director of the UMW Oil and Gas Division from April 2011 to December 2011. He also served as Executive Director of the Group's Corporate Development Division before being appointed as Head of UMW Group Operations in January 2013.

He was also involved in senior management and directors at several companies such as Khazanah Nasional, Proton, Lotus and DRB-HICOM.

Badrul Feisal was appointed President and CEO of UMW on 1 October 2015 replacing Syed Hisham Syed Wazir whose contract expired.

He held the position of Associate Professor at the Center for Manufacturing Engineering Learning, University of Perlis, and was a member of the University of Kuala Lumpur UniKL Industry Advisory Board.

Death
Badrul Feisal died on 31 May 2020 at KPJ Ampang Puteri Hospital due to a heart attack.

After his death, he was succeeded by Azmin Che Yusoff as the acting President and CEO effective 5 June 2020.

References

1969 births
2020 deaths
Malaysian people of Malay descent
Malaysian Muslims
People from Kuala Lumpur
Malaysian businesspeople
Malaysian business executives
University of Missouri alumni